Rafael Nadal defeated Juan Carlos Ferrero in the final, 6–1, 7–6(7–4), 7–3 to win the singles title at the 2005 Barcelona Open. With the win, Nadal entered the ATP top 10 singles rankings for the first time, debuting at no. 7.

Tommy Robredo was the defending champion, but lost to Alberto Martín in the second round.

This tournament was the first professional appearance of future world No. 1 and three-time major champion Andy Murray.

Seeds

Draw

Key
WC - Wildcard
Q - Qualifier
LL - Lucky loser

Finals

Earlier rounds

Section 1

Section 2

Section 3

Section 4

Qualifying Draw

References

Torneo Godo
2005 Torneo Godó